"Powershifter" is a Fear Factory single released in fall 2009. The song is the fourth track and first single from the band's seventh album Mechanize. The official music video for the song was directed by Myles Dyer and released on YouTube in late June 2011.

Lyrics 
The lyrics deal about forcing war to change the world in order to live. The lyrics were written by Burton C. Bell and Dino Cazares. Bell explained the lyrics to illustrate that: "Change is an inevitable course in nature and humanity. This world has seen much change as of late, and it is true globally, nationally, and personally. This is a true story of a personal struggle against a controlling and ineffectual organization. There is always a choice, and the choice is never easy."

References 

Fear Factory songs
2009 singles
Songs written by Burton C. Bell
2009 songs
Songs written by Dino Cazares